Kathiawari Memons, a sub-group of the Memons, arrived in Ceylon (Sri Lanka) from the Kathiawar region of Gujarat, India beginning in the 1870s. 

Sunni Hanafi Muslims by origin, the Memons are entrepreneurs and traders who settled in Sri Lanka for business opportunities during the colonial period. Some of these people came to the country as far back as the Portuguese period. They settled permanently in Sri Lanka after the partition of India in 1947. 

The majority of these Memons were from the historical village of Kutiyana, in Junagadh, Gujarat, India; among other villages in Kathiawar. They are variously known as Mir, Pinjara, Allahrakha, Khatri and Mulla. 

Sri Lankan Memons are strictly following the traditional and cultural values of the International Memon community. Memons in Sri Lanka are represented by the Memon Association of Sri Lanka.

History 

Early 1900s, Kathiawar Memon merchants and traders; mainly from Kutiyana, Porbandar and Upleta  traveled to Ceylon (in modern Sri Lanka) to trade and exploit business opportunities. Memon people started the trading route between India and Sri lanka in early 1930s. Memon merchants brought variety of Indian products to Ceylon (in modern Sri Lanka), it mainly consisted textiles and it was sold in the Colombo Pettah market.   

Reason for mass migration and settlement of Memon people around the world was due to the Gujarat's Hindu-Muslim riot in 1947, which was initiated due to the Partition of India. Many Memons in the Kathiawar region were attacked and were looted by the mobs, which resulted in great loss to the Memon community especially in the Junagadh District and surrounding villages in modern state of Gujarat in India.  After the riots, extremely affected Memon people from the Kathiawar region were replaced in refugee camps in the bordering cities nearby the State of Gujarat, India.   

Lately, Memon people started migrating to other states within India, and large number of them migrated and settled in modern Pakistan. Memon merchants who were involved in the trading route between India and Sri Lanka, decided to migrate and settle in Ceylon (in modern Sri Lanka) along with their families.  

Memon people were firstly based in Colombo 12 in the early 1950s and gradually started to expand and move to other parts of the Colombo city. Memon association of Ceylon was formed in the year 1956 in Hullsdorf, Colombo by well known personalities of the Memon community in Sri Lanka. Lately it was changed to Memon association of Sri Lanka.

See also
Memon People
Gujarati People
Kathiawari Memon
Saurashtra (region)

References

Further reading
Memons of Sri Lanka - Men Memoirs Milestones. Asiff Hussein and Hameed Karim Bhoja. (2006). Published by The Memon Association of Sri Lanka.

External links

Memon Association of Sri Lanka 

Indians in Sri Lanka
Social groups of Sri Lanka

Memon
Sri Lankan people of Indian descent